is a resonant trans-Neptunian object from the Kuiper belt, located in the outermost region of the Solar System in the Kuiper belt's plutino population and measures approximately  in diameter. It was first observed on 26 July 2017, by American astronomers David Tholen, Scott Sheppard, and Chad Trujillo at Mauna Kea Observatories in Hawaii, but not announced until 31 May 2018 due to observations made in April and May 2018 refining its orbit significantly.

Orbit and classification 

 is a large plutino, a subgroup of the resonant trans-Neptunian objects located in the inner region of Kuiper belt. Named after the group's largest member, Pluto, the plutinos are making 2 orbits for every 3 Neptune makes.

It orbits the Sun at a distance of 31.4–47.8 AU once every 249 years and 6 months (91,128 days; semi-major axis of 39.63 AU). Its orbit has an eccentricity of 0.21 and an inclination of 14° with respect to the ecliptic. The body's observation arc begins with a precovery by Pan-STARRS in June 2012.

Numbering and naming 

As of 2018, this minor planet has neither been numbered nor named by the Minor Planet Center. The official discoverer(s) will be defined when the object is numbered.

Physical characteristics

Diameter and albedo 

According to the Johnston's archive,  measures 533 kilometers in diameter assuming an albedo of 0.09 for the body's surface. 

This makes  a notably large body for how late it has been discovered, being the fifth largest plutino in the Solar System, after , Orcus, and Ixion, and the largest discovered since Orcus in 2004. It is unknown exactly why no surveys had discovered it previously, as it is neither in a particularly dense region of the sky, nor far enough south that most northern hemisphere-based surveys would ignore it, being only 5–6° south of the celestial equator. It seems unlikely that any body as large as this one remains undetected in the plutino region.

Rotation period 

As of 2018, no rotational lightcurve of  has been obtained from photometric observations. The body's rotation period, pole and shape remain unknown.

References

External links 
 List of Transneptunian Objects, Minor Planet Center
 
 

Minor planet object articles (unnumbered)

20170726